Xie Silida (born 19 June 1990 in Kunming, Yunnan, China), is a Chinese-born Hong Kong footballer who plays for Hong Kong Second Division club Kwai Tsing. He plays mainly as a center-back but has also played as a defensive midfielder on some occasions.

Club career

Beijing Guoan
Xie joined Beijing Guoan youth academy after he left Yunnan Hongta, his hometown-based club. However, in 2010, he was informed that the club would not sign a professional contract with him.

Tuen Mun
In the beginning of the 2010–11 season, Xie joined the newly promoted Hong Kong First Division side Tuen Mun, as a Chinese expatriates footballer.

He made his debut for Tuen Mun in a home league match against Tai Po at Tuen Mun Tang Shiu Kin Sports Ground on 25 September 2010, which the team was defeated 2–1. Xie was the 68-minute substitute for Yuen Lap Cheung in the match. However, since Xie was counted as a foreign player while at the same 4 other foreign teammates were still in the team, according to the rules in that season, only 4 foreign players could be in playing for a team at the same time. As a result, Tuen Mun was penalize for a 0–3 defeat. Xie started for the first time and eventually scored his first goal for Tuen Mun on 24 October 2010, an away league match against TSW Pegasus at Yuen Long Stadium. However, the goal was not enough to win the match, as they lost 1–2.

On loan Hong Kong Sapling
In February 2012, Xie was loaned to another First Division side Hong Kong Sapling until the end of the season.

Back to Tuen Mun
He made his debut of the season on 20 October 2012, in a home league match against Biu Chun Rangers at Tuen Mun Tang Shiu Kin Sports Ground, as a 90-minute substitute for Yip Tsz Chun.

Career statistics

Club
 As of 23 December 2012

References

External links
 

Tuen Mun SA players
1990 births
Living people
Hong Kong First Division League players
Hong Kong Premier League players
Chinese footballers
Chinese expatriate footballers
Expatriate footballers in Hong Kong
Association football defenders
Dreams Sports Club players
Chinese expatriate sportspeople in Hong Kong
Footballers from Yunnan
Beijing Guoan F.C. players
Yunnan Hongta players
Hong Kong Rangers FC players
Tai Po FC players